The little crake (Zapornia parva) is a very small waterbird of the family Rallidae.  parva is Latin for "small".

Its breeding habitat is reed beds in Europe, mainly in the east, and just into western Asia. This species is migratory, wintering in Africa.

At  in length, they are slightly smaller than the spotted crake, from which they are readily distinguished by the lack of dark barring and white spots on the flanks. The little crake has a short straight bill, yellow with a red base. They have green legs with long toes, and a short tail which is barred black and white underneath. Unlike other Porzana crakes, this species has strong sexual dimorphism: Adult males have mainly brown upperparts and blue-grey face and underparts. They resemble the sympatric Baillon's crake (P. pusilla), which has strongly barred flanks and is a little smaller. Females have buff underparts, and are grey only on the face; they are more similar to the yellow-breasted crake (P. flaviventer) of the American tropics. Immature little crakes are similar to the female but have a white face and breast. The downy chicks are black, as with all rails.

These birds probe with their bill in mud or shallow water, also picking up food by sight. They mainly eat insects and aquatic animals. Little crakes are very secretive in the breeding season, and are then mostly heard rather than seen. They can be easier to see on migration. They are then noisy birds, with a yapping kua call. They nest in a dry location in reed vegetation, laying 4–7 eggs.

The little crake is one of the species to which the Agreement on the Conservation of African-Eurasian Migratory Waterbirds (AEWA) applies.

References

External links

 
 
 
 
 
 

little crake
Birds of Europe
Birds of Russia
Birds of Central Asia
Birds of Africa
Birds of South Asia
Birds of Western Asia
little crake